The Provisional Cabinet of Konstantinos Kanaris (12 February 1844 – 30 March 1844) was a provisional government formed when the government of Andreas Metaxas lost the support of the National Assembly of 1843.

Members of the Cabinet 
 Konstantinos Kanaris, President of the Council of Ministers and Secretary for Naval Affairs (member of the Russian Party)
 Andreas Londos, Secretary for Military Affairs and for the Interior
 Drosos Mansolas, Secretary for Foreign Affairs and Secretary for the Royal Household and Finance
 Leon Melas, Secretary for Justice and for Religious Affairs and Public Education
 Georgios Kountouriotis, President of the Council of State (member of the French Party)

See also

Kanaris
1844 in Greece
Provisional governments